A Shayna Maidel is a play by Barbara Lebow about the reunion of two sisters after World War II, one having survived the Nazi concentration camps.

References

External links
A Shayna Maidel Google Books view

Off-Broadway plays
Shayna Maidel
Shayna Maidel
Shayna Maidel
Shayna Maidel